Tadeusz Balcerowski (5 January 1933, Pawliczka – 26 October 2020, Radom) is a Polish politician from the Polish People's Party. He served as member of the Sejm from 2004 to 2005.

References

1933 births
2020 deaths
People from Masovian Voivodeship
Polish People's Party politicians
Members of the Polish Sejm 2001–2005